D'Pharaoh Miskwaatez McKay Woon-A-Tai (born 19 September 2001) is a Canadian actor. He is best known for his role as Bear Smallhill in the FX on Hulu comedy-drama series Reservation Dogs (2021), for which he was nominated for a Critics' Choice Television Award for Best Actor in a Comedy Series.

Early life
Woon-A-Tai and his fraternal twin Mi’De Xxavier were born in Toronto. Born D'Pharaoh Miskwaatez Loescher McKay Woon-A-Tai, his names reflect his Oji-Cree, Chinese-Guyanese, and German heritage. A black belt in Shotokan karate, he is the grandson of the notable Shotokan instructor Frank Woon-A-Tai on his mother's side. His paternal grandfather is Dr. Alex McKay, an Anishinaabemowin language professor at the University of Toronto's Indigenous Studies department.

Woon-A-Tai and his three (of what would eventually become five) siblings grew up in the Esplanade neighbourhood of Toronto and visited their paternal family in the Kitchenuhmaykoosib Inninuwug First Nation at the weekends. He attended Nelson Mandela Park Public School.

Career
Woon-A-Tai began his career with a recurring role as Chase Whaley in season 1 of the 2018 Family Channel series Holly Hobbie. In 2019, Woon-A-Tai played Tom Longboat in a two-episode arc of Murdoch Mysteries season 12. He made guest appearances as Lucky in Creeped Out and Mikey in Tribal.

Woon-A-Tai made his feature film debut as Hank in the film Beans directed by Tracey Deer, which was a 2020 Toronto International Film Festival selection and won Best Motion Picture at the Canadian Screen Awards.

In December 2020, it was announced Woon-A-Tai would star as Bear Smallhill in the 2021 FX on Hulu comedy-drama Reservation Dogs, "a slice-of-life triumph" from Sterlin Harjo and Taika Waititi. Set and filmed in rural Oklahoma, Reservation Dogs is a coming-of-age story that follows the antics of rebellious teenagers living on tribal land. The series' cast and crew are made up entirely of Indigenous people. The Denver Gazette described Bear as "played spectacularly by D’Pharaoh, this series' breakout star." Reservation Dogs' second season premiered on August 3, 2022.

In 2022, it was announced that Woon-A-Tai would be joining Finn Wolfhard and Billy Bryk in the duo's directorial debut Hell Of A Summer to be released sometime in 2023. Woon-A-Tai plays Adam in the 2023 film Bloody Hell. He is set to star in Indie Thriller film Only the Good Survive alongside; Sidney Flanigan, Frederick Weller, and Will Ropp, set to be released in 2023.

Personal life 
Woon-A-Tai is said to be dating American Model and Activist, Quannah Chasinghorse since 2021. The pair live together in Los Angeles, and are both signed to IMG as models and for talent management. They both appear together in the music video for Rob & Jack Lahana's single "Haute saison".

Filmography

Film

Television

Web series

Videography

Music videos

Awards and nominations

References

External links

Living people
2001 births
21st-century First Nations people
21st-century Guyanese actors
Canadian people of Chinese descent
Canadian people of German descent
Canadian people of Guyanese descent
First Nations male actors
Male actors from Toronto
Oji-Cree people